The Track of Sand  (orig. Italian La pista di sabbia) is a 2007 novel by Andrea Camilleri, translated into English in 2010 by Stephen Sartarelli. It is the twelfth novel in the internationally popular Inspector Montalbano series.

The Sicilian inspector looks out his window and sees the carcass of a horse on the beach. The animal, he discovers, has been bludgeoned to death. As he turns his back to phone in the crime, the horse vanishes, leaving a track in the sand. Was the horse slaughtered for its meat by illegal immigrants? Is someone trying to send a message to the owner? Or is the Mafia edging its way into the racing industry? The repeated vandalizing of Montalbano's home and a Mafia thug's murder complicate the investigation.

2007 Italian novels
Inspector Montalbano novels
Italian crime novels
Italian mystery novels
Novels set in Sicily

de:Die Passion des stillen Rächers